Biləcik or Biledzhik or Baledzhik or Bilyadzhik may refer to:
Birinci Biləcik, Azerbaijan
İkinci Biləcik, Azerbaijan

See also
Bilecik, a city in Turkey